{{DISPLAYTITLE:C30H26O13}}
The molecular formula C30H26O13 (molar mass: 594.52 g/mol, exact mass: 594.137340 u) may refer to:
 Prodelphinidin B3 (gallocatechin-(4α→8)-catechin), a condensed tannin
 Prodelphinidin B9 (epigallocatechin-(4α→8)-catechin), a condensed tannin